Palmaria may refer to:

Palmaria (island), an island in the Ligurian Sea, Italy
Palmaria (artillery), an Italian-made self-propelled howitzer
Palmaria (alga), a genus of red algae
Palmaria palmata, a species of red algae

nl:Palmaria (geslacht)